A Hellmouth, or the jaws of Hell, is the entrance to Hell envisaged as the gaping mouth of a huge monster, an image which first appeared in Anglo-Saxon art, and then spread all over Europe.  It remained very common in depictions of the Last Judgment and Harrowing of Hell until the end of the Middle Ages, and is still sometimes used during the Renaissance and after.  It enjoyed something of a revival in polemical popular prints after the Protestant Reformation, when figures from the opposite side would be shown disappearing into the mouth. A notable late appearance is in the two versions of a painting by El Greco of about 1578. Political cartoons still showed Napoleon leading his troops into one.

 
Medieval theatre often had a hellmouth prop or mechanical device which was used to attempt to scare the audience by vividly dramatizing an entrance to Hell.  These seem often to have featured a battlemented castle entrance, in painting usually associated with Heaven.

History

The oldest example of an animal Hellmouth known to Meyer Schapiro was an ivory carving of c. 800 in the Victoria and Albert Museum, and he says most examples before the 12th century are English.  Many show the Harrowing of Hell, which appealed to Anglo-Saxon taste, as a successful military raid by Christ. Schapiro speculates that the image may have drawn from the pagan myth of the Crack of Doom, with the mouth that of the wolf-monster Fenrir, slain by Vidar, who is used as a symbol of Christ on the Gosforth Cross and other pieces of Anglo-Scandinavian art.  In the assimilation of Christianised Viking populations in northern England, the Church was surprisingly ready to allow the association of pagan mythological images with Christian ones, in hogback grave markers for example.

In the Anglo-Saxon Vercelli Homilies (4:46-8) Satan is likened to a dragon swallowing the damned:

... ne cumaþ þa næfre of þæra wyrma seaðe & of þæs dracan ceolan þe is Satan nemned.

[they] never come out of the pit of snakes and of the throat of the dragon which is called Satan.

The whale-monster Leviathan (translated from Hebrew, Job 41:1, "wreathed animal") has been equated with this description, although this is hard to confirm in the earliest appearances.  However, in The Whale, an Old English poem from the Exeter Book, the mouth of Hell is compared to a whale's mouth:

The whale has another trick: when he is hungry, he opens his mouth and a sweet smell comes out.  The fish are tricked by the smell and they enter into his mouth.  Suddenly the whale's jaws close.

Likewise, any man who lets himself be tricked by a sweet smell and led to sin will go into hell, opened by the devil—if he has followed the pleasures of the body and not those of the spirit.  When the devil has brought them to hell, he clashes together the jaws, the gates of hell.  No one can get out from them, just as no fish can escape from the mouth of the whale.

Later in the Middle Ages the classical Cerberus also became associated with the image, although it is hardly likely that the Anglo-Saxons had him in mind.

Satan himself is often shown sitting in Hell eating the damned, but according to G.D. Schmidt this is a separate image, and the Hellmouth should not be considered to be the mouth of Satan, although Hofmann is inclined to disagree with this. The Hellmouth never bites the damned, remaining wide open, ready for more.

In general the motif had fallen from favour in Italy and the Netherlands by the late 14th century, and is rarely seen in the many Last Judgements in Early Netherlandish painting, but in late medieval works by Hieronymous Bosch and his followers, where the wide interior of Hell is shown, there is often a Hellmouth leading to some special compartment.  It continued in use in Germany and France. The Hellmouth appears, swallowing a bishop, at bottom left in The Four Horsemen of the Apocalypse, a famous woodcut by Albrecht Dürer (c. 1497–98).

Gallery

Citations

General references 
 Hofmann Petra (2008). Infernal Imagery in Anglo-Saxon Charters. PhD thesis. St Andrews, Fife, Scotland: University of St Andrews. .

Further reading
 Schmidt, G. D. The Iconography of the Mouth of Hell: Eighth-Century Britain to the Fifteenth Century, 1995, Selinsgrove, PA, Susquehanna University Press, 1995, 
 Simmons, Austin. The Cipherment of the Franks Casket (PDF). Hellmouth (or the whale as constituting Hell) is inferred in the inscription on the front side of the Franks Casket.

External links 
 

Stage terminology
History of theatre
Christian iconography
Hell (Christianity)
Anglo-Saxon art
Leviathan